La Coupe de l'Outre-Mer de football 2012 was the third edition of the Coupe de l'Outre-Mer, a football tournament for the overseas departments and territories of France.  It took place from  22 September to 29 September 2012

Draw
The draw for the group stage was made on 20 April 2012. The finalists from the 2010 edition, Martinique and Réunion, were seeded for the draw.

Group stage

Group A

Group B

Play-off round

Play-off for the seventh place

Play-off for the fifth place

Play-off for the third place

Final

Goal scorers
7 goals
 Jean-Michel Fontaine

5 goals

 Gary Pigrée
 Vladimir Pascal
 Chamsidine Attoumani

4 goals
 Dominique Mocka

3 goals

 Stéphan Clet
 Samuel Zénon
 Jacques Haeko
 Kévin Parsemain

2 goals

 Cléberson Martins dos Santos
 Teddy Bacoul
 Ludovic Gotin
 Steeve Gustan
 Kévin Tresfield
 Bertrand Kaï
 Roy Kayara
 Luther Whanyamalla
 Christopher Achelous
 Éric Farro
 Mohamed El Madaghri 
 Alvin Tehau

1 goal

 Serge Lespérance
 André Pikiento
 Françoi Sampain
 Samuel Sophie
 Joffrey Torvic
 Mathias Babel
 Michel Lafortune
 Jean-Luc Lambourde
 Stéphane Abaul
 Jordy Delem
 Emile Béaruné 
 Georges Béaruné
 Iamel Kabeu
 Dick Kauma
 Yoann Mercier
 Cédric Moagou
 Christopher Pythie
 Mickaël Vallant
 Xavier Delamaire
 Kevin Mathiaud
 Stanley Atani
 Steevy Chong Hue
 Roihau Degage
 Nicolas Vallar

1 own goal

 Davide Audouze (playing against Réunion)
 Rémi Audouze (playing against New Caledonia)

References

External links 
 Official tournament website

2008
2012–13 in French football
2012–13 in Caribbean football
2012–13 in OFC football
2012 in African football